There are a variety of titles are used to refer to the penultimate prophet of Islam, Isa ibn Maryam (Jesus), in the Quran. Islamic scholars emphasize the need for Muslims to follow the name of Isa (Jesus), whether spoken or written, with the honorific phrase , which means peace be upon him. Isa is mentioned by name or title 78 times in the Quran.

Names

Isa ibn Maryam

Isa is also referred to as Isa ibn Maryam, meaning Isa, son of Maryam. In the Quran, Isa is referred to by name 23 times.

Masih 

Isa is the Messiah in Islam and is the called Īsā al-Masīḥ by Muslims. It is one of several titles of Isa, who is referred to as Masih or Al-Masih 11 times in the Quran. It means 'the anointed', 'the traveller', or 'one who cures by caressing'.

Titles

Spirit of God 
The Arabic word Ruhullah is composed of the elements Ruh (Spirit) and Allah (God). Thus, Ruhullah means "Spirit of God". Ruh can also be used to mean the blowing of breath, a reference to the conception of Isa, which took place when the Holy Spirit (Rūḥ) blew His breath onto Maryam's collar. 

Isa is called Ruhullah 11 times in the Quran.

Pure Boy 
According the Quran and Hadith, Isa and his mother Maryam were the only two people whom Shaitan did not touch and so were without sin, so Isa is called a pure boy. He is referred to as pure boy nine times in the Quran.

Word of God 

Isa is called Kalima (Word) or Kalimat Allah (Word of God) six times in the Quran. The concept of Logos also appears in the Targums (Aramaic translations of the Hebrew Bible dating to the first centuries AD), where the term Memra (Aramaic for "The Word") is often used instead of 'The Lord', especially when referring to a manifestation of God that could be construed as anthropomorphic.

Sign 
In Islam, Isa's return is one of the ten major signs of Day of Resurrection. In the Quran, Isa is four times called an Āyah (also used to designate a verse of the Quran).

Wajih 
In Surat al-Imran verse 3:45, Isa is called  ('honourable' or 'distinguished'), a title also used for Musa (Moses) in Surat al-Ahzab 33:69. Many Muslims refer to Isa as Īsā al-Wajīḥ, since he is an honoured Prophet in Islam.

The Truth 
Isa is called Qawlal Haqqi (Al-Haqq) "The Truth", the "Word of Truth", and "Statement of the Truth" in the verse 34 of Maryam.

Notes

References 

Islam-related lists